Jun-ha, also spelled Chun-ha or Joon-ha, is a Korean masculine given name. Its meaning differs based on the hanja used to write each syllable of the name. There are 34 hanja with the reading "joon" and 24 hanja with the reading "ha" on the South Korean government's official list of hanja which may be registered for use in given names.

People with this name include:
Chang Chun-ha (1918–1975), Korean independence activist, later a South Korean journalist and politician
Jeong Jun-ha (born 1971), South Korean comedian 
Yoon Jun-ha (born 1987), South Korean football player 
Lee Joon-ha (born 2001), South Korean child actress

Fictional characters with this name include:
Junah, one of the title characters of the 2001 South Korean film Wanee & Junah

See also
List of Korean given names

References

Korean masculine given names